Walter Trengof (or Treugof, died 1445) was an English medieval churchman and university Chancellor.

Trengof attended Exeter College, Oxford. He was three times Chancellor of the University of Oxford during 1417–21. From 1436 until his death in 1445, he was the Archdeacon of Cornwall.

References

Year of birth unknown
1445 deaths
Alumni of Exeter College, Oxford
Chancellors of the University of Oxford
Archdeacons of Cornwall
15th-century English people
15th-century English clergy